The Kabalikat ng Malayang Pilipino (KAMPI), formerly known as the Kabalikat ng Mamamayang Pilipino, was a political party in the Philippines. It is the main party of former President Gloria Macapagal Arroyo. In June 2008, Kampi merged into the Lakas–CMD.

History

KAMPI was formed during the run up to the 1998 presidential elections as the vehicle for then Senator Arroyo's presidential campaign, after she defected from the Laban ng Demokratikong Pilipino, the party she had been with since she was first elected in 1995. Vicente Sotto III was picked to be her running mate. Before the filing of candidacies, she decided to be the running mate of then Lakas-NUCD-UMDP presidential hopeful Jose de Venecia.  As a result, KAMPI coalesced with Lakas-NUCD-UMDP during the 1998 presidential elections.

There were no results available of the last elections for the House of Representatives, but according to the website of the House, the party holds 26 out of 235 seats (State of the Parties, June 2005). The party was at the 2004 elections member of the Koalisyon ng Katapatan at Karanasan sa Kinabukasan (K-4, Coalition of Truth and Experience for Tomorrow), the coalition that supported president Gloria Macapagal Arroyo, who won the 2004 presidential elections. Many legislators of the Lakas-Christian Muslim Democrats defected to Kampi.

Currently, KAMPI is actively recruiting members to bolster its chances to be the biggest party in the country jeopardizing its alliance with Lakas CMD because they are raiding local officials allied with Lakas CMD or they are fielding candidates against incumbent administration officials.

As of March 24, 2007, KAMPI is said to have 67 members of the House of Representatives, 23 provincial governors, and 650 out of the 1610 mayors all over the country. In the May 14, 2007 election, the party won 47 seats.

On January 31, 2008, Kabalikat ng Malayang Pilipino (KAMPI) announced that 134 congressman signed a manifesto of "loss of confidence" versus Speaker Jose de Venecia, Jr. Camarines Sur 2nd District Rep. Luis Villafuerte, KAMPI president, said the successor should be Davao City 4th district Rep. Prospero Nograles.

Merger with Lakas-CMD

Former President and Lakas-CMD Chairman Emeritus Fidel V. Ramos announced on February 6, 2008, that Lakas-CMD would be the surviving entity after its merger with KAMPI.

Gloria Macapagal Arroyo on June 18, 2008, confirmed the historical merger of the Lakas Christian Muslim Democrats (Lakas-CMD) and the Kabalikat ng Malayang Pilipino (Kampi) parties. Both parties adopted the “equity of the incumbent” principle, as the merger will account for almost 200 national and 8,000 local officials, amid Mrs. Arroyo's prediction of  2010 elections victory. Prospero Nograles, Lakas President and Kampi Chair Ronaldo Puno signed the covenant at the Davao City regional caucus.

Electoral performance

Presidential and vice presidential elections

Legislative elections

Notable members 

 Gloria Macapagal Arroyo - Chairman Emeritus; 14th Philippine President
 Ronaldo Puno - Chairman
 Jose "Peping" Cojuangco, Jr. - Vice Chairman
 Luis Villafuerte, Sr. - President
 Joker Arroyo (Two-term Senator)
 Manny Pacquiao
 Pablo P. Garcia (late Cebu Governor)

References

External links
 KAMPI website
 Lakas-KAMPI-CMD Website 

Defunct political parties in the Philippines
Political parties established in 1997
Political parties disestablished in 2009
1997 establishments in the Philippines
2009 disestablishments in the Philippines